Romanby is a village and civil parish in the Hambleton District of North Yorkshire, England. Romanby is situated just south-west of Northallerton, and at the 2001 UK census had a population of 6,051, increasing to 6,177 at the 2011 Census.

The name Romanby suggests that the village dates from Roman times, but in fact it is thought to derive from the Viking name Hromund.

The Community of Romanby is served by Romanby Primary School. The local secondary school and sixth form is Northallerton School.

Romanby Church was demolished in 1523 on the orders of the Bishop of Durham, Thomas Wolsey. Romanby now has two churches, St James' Church (built in 1882) and Romanby Methodist Church.

Romanby Golf Course lies on the outskirts of Romanby, it has an 18-hole course, floodlit driving range and a clubhouse.

Northallerton Town Football Club is located in Romanby.  The village has several shops, a post office, a dentist, a hairdressers and a pub, the Golden Lion.

The Wensleydale Railway passes over a bridge just on the outskirts of Romanby Village on its way up to Redmire from Northallerton West railway station.

North Yorkshire County council offices stand between Romanby village and Northallerton on what was previously a racecourse. Designed by the York architect Walter Brierley for the North Riding council. The main building was constructed in 1904–14 in two storeys of ashlar and red brick to a square courtyard plan, with a 15 bay frontage by 23 bay returns. It is a grade II* listed building.

Demographics
An electoral ward in the same name exists. This ward does not cover all the parish and had a total population at the 2011 Census of 3,946.

References

External links

Romanby war memorial details on IWM website

Villages in North Yorkshire
Civil parishes in North Yorkshire